Anna Myrra Malmberg (born 20 December 1966) is a Swedish singer, songwriter, and photographer.

Early life 
Anna Myrra Malmberg was born in the Stockholm suburb of Farsta, and spent her childhood in Minneapolis, Minnesota and her teenage years in Stockholm, Sweden. She graduated the Stockholm High School of Music and immediately embarked upon a theatrical career. Early on she took on roles such as Maria in West Side Story, Hodel in Fiddler on the Roof and Grizabella in Cats, but also straight acting roles such as Poppy in Noises Off.

Career 
In London's West End, where she was cast as Christine in The Phantom of the Opera by director Hal Prince, Malmberg also played Cosette in Les Misérables, Estella in Great Expectations and The Narrator in Joseph and the Amazing Technicolor Dreamcoat. She caught the attention of Andrew Lloyd Webber and joined the cast of The Music of Andrew Lloyd Webber at St Paul's Cathedral and elsewhere. Malmberg also appeared in the Royal Variety Show, broadcast by the BBC from the London Palladium, BBC's Blue Peter, GMTV and the BBC series Showstoppers, opposite Gary Wilmot.

Other roles include Eva Perón in Evita at the Gothenburg Opera, Emma Carew in Jekyll and Hyde at Stockholm's China Theatre and Maria in West Side Story at the Rome Opera in Italy and the Gothenburg Opera, Sweden.

Malmberg's Swedish TV credits span drama, including Fallet Paragon, to popular entertainment shows, such as Allsång på Skansen, Go'kväll, Söndagsöppet and Så ska det låta. She also appeared on Celebrity Jeopardy (which she won) and participated in Melodifestivalen (Eurovision Song Contest). She has also performed as a special guest star in Russia's own Eurovision in the early 1990s to 80 million viewers.

Her discography includes a Stephen Sondheim retrospective, Myrra Malmberg Sings Sondheim: What Can You Lose, Lloyd Webber's music accompanied by a string quartet on Myrra Malmberg Sings Lloyd Webber: Unexpected, a handful of bossa nova albums especially successful throughout Asia, the singer/songwriter album Serendipity, plus various cast albums and soundtracks. She has been awarded a Grammy.

Malmberg's latest recording is the classical crossover, Another World. Together with the Norrköping Symphony Orchestra and internationally renowned conductor Paul Bateman she explores the musical territory between the classical and popular music genres.

Malmberg has lent her voice to a long list of Disney characters in their Swedish incarnations, including Princess Jasmine in Aladdin, Ariel in The Little Mermaid, Wendy in Peter Pan, Megara in Hercules and Norma Jean in Happy Feet.

She has written songs and lyrics for other recording artists and has translated lyrics and scripts into Swedish from English, French and Danish, including Jekyll and Hyde – the Musical for Malmö Opera.

Her photography includes portraits and album covers for various recording artists such as Benny Andersson, Berndt Rosengren, and The Sweet Jazz Trio. Malmberg has also held solo exhibits of her work.

Selected stage performances

Filmography 
 2019 – Toy Story 4, "Mom" Disney
 2018 – Ralph Breaks the Internet, "Ariel and Princess Jasmine" Disney
 2014 – Song of the Sea, "Bronagh" Cartoon Saloon
 2012 – Secret of the Wings, "Healing Fairy" Disney
 2011 – Happy Feet Two, "Norma Jean" Warner Bros
 2010 – Toy Story 3, "Mom" Disney
 2009 – Hannah Montana: The Movie, "Lorelai" Disney
 2008 – Kiki's Delivery Service, "Mrs Osono" Studio Ghibli
 2008 – Deep Sea, "Narrator" IMAX
 2008 – The Little Mermaid: Ariel's Beginning, "Ariel" Disney
 2008 – Disney Princess Enchanted Tales: Follow Your Dreams, "Princess Jasmine" Disney
 2007–2009 – Phineas and Ferb, "Mom" Disney
 2007 – Kim Possible, "Shego" Disney
 2007 – Happy Feet, "Norma Jean" Warner Bros
 2006 – Underdog, "Polly" Disney
 2005 – The Emperor's New Groove 2: Kronk's New Groove, "Miss Birdwell" Disney
 2005 – Barbie and the Magic of Pegasus, "Brietta" Universal Pictures
 2002 – Peter Pan II: Return to Never Land, "Wendy" Disney
 2000 – The Little Mermaid II: Return to the Sea, "Ariel" Disney
 1999 – The Magic Sword: Quest for Camelot, "Kayley" Warner Bros
 1998 – Mary Poppins, "Mary Poppins" Disney
 1997 – Beauty and the Beast: The Enchanted Christmas, "Angelique" Disney
 1997 – Hercules, "Megara" Disney
 1997 – 101 Dalmatians, "Anita"  Disney
 1996 – Aladdin and the King of Thieves, "Princess Jasmine" Disney
 1994 – The Return of Jafar, "Princess Jasmine" Disney
 1994 – Fallet Paragon, "Ulrika" Swedish Television Drama
 1993 – Peter Pan, "Wendy" Disney
 1993 – We're Back! A Dinosaur's Story, "Elsa and Dr. Bleeb" Amblin Entertainment and Steven Spielberg
 1992 – Aladdin, "Princess Jasmine" Disney

Discography

Solo albums

Cast recording & soundtracks 

 2009 – Bröderna Lejonhjärta, Naxos
2009 – Disney: En magisk värld, Egmont
2001 – Evita, Swedish cast, BMG
1997 – Hercules – Swedish soundtrack, Buena Vista
1995 – Great Expectations – Highlights Cast Recording, TER records
1994 – Aladdin: The Return of Jafar – Swedish soundtrack, Buena Vista
1993 – Aladdin – Swedish soundtrack, Buena Vista

Compilations 
2010 – 100 Moments Lounge
2005 – Svenska Musikalfavoriter

Guest appearances 
2005 – My Rubber Soul/Peter Nordahl Trio, BMG
1998 – Easy Listening för Masochister/Carl-Johan Vallgren, Twin

References

External links 
 Official website

Living people
1966 births
Swedish women singers
Singers from Stockholm
Melodifestivalen contestants of 1998